Todt is a German surname.

Surname 

People with the Todt surname include:

 Anthony Todt (born 1975), American mass murderer (2019 Todt family murders)
 Emil Todt ( 18101900), German artist and sculptor
 Fritz Todt (18911942), German engineer; founder of Nazi agency Organisation Todt 
 Hans Jürgen Todt (born 1937), German athlete
 Jean Todt (born 1946), French executive and co-driver
 Jens Todt (born 1970), German footballer
 Nicolas Todt (born 1977), French motorsport team owner
 Phil Todt (19011973), American baseball player

Other uses 

Todt may also refer to:

 Organisation Todt, a German civil and military engineering group
 Todt Battery, German World War II coastal artillery site in Calais, France
 Todt family murders, 2019 familicide in Florida, United States
 Todt Hill, a small mountain ridge on Staten Island, New York